Papas arrugadas is a traditional boiled potato dish eaten in the Canary Islands. It is usually served with a chili pepper garlic sauce, called mojo rojo, or as an accompaniment to meat dishes.

The dish is made from small new potatoes which are cleaned (but not peeled), then boiled in salt water. Originally, seawater was used, but today it is more common to use tap water with a very generous amount of salt added.  After cooking, the water is removed and the potatoes are briefly left in the pot on the stove to dry off, until they become shrivelled with a fine salt crust.

Papas arrugadas are considered a signature dish of Canarian cuisine. The dish is sometimes served with conejo en salmorejo, a common Canarian rabbit stew.

See also 
Salt potatoes
List of Spanish dishes

References 

Canarian culture
Canary Islands cuisine
Potato dishes
Baked foods
National dishes